H. brassicae may refer to:

 Helminthosporium brassicae, a plant pathogen
 Hyaloperonospora brassicae, a plant pathogen